The Argentine Republic motorcycle Grand Prix is the Argentine round of the FIM Grand Prix motorcycle racing championship.  The Grand Prix returned in 2014 with a race at Autódromo Termas de Río Hondo.  Previously, the event was held ten times at the Autódromo Oscar Alfredo Gálvez in the capital city of Buenos Aires between 1961 and 1999 and was known as the Argentine motorcycle Grand Prix.

The event is due to take place at the Autódromo Termas de Río Hondo until at least 2025.

Official names and sponsors
1982, 1987: Grand Prix de la República Argentina (no official sponsor)
1994–1995: Grand Prix Marlboro
1998–1999: Gran Premio Marlboro de Argentina
2014–2015: Gran Premio Red Bull de la República Argentina
2016–2019: Gran Premio Motul de la República Argentina
2022–present: Gran Premio Michelin de la República Argentina

Winners of the Argentine motorcycle Grand Prix
A pink background indicates an event that was not part of the Grand Prix motorcycle racing championship.

Multiple winners (riders)

Multiple winners (manufacturers)

By year

References

External links
History of the Grand Prix of Argentina

 
Recurring sporting events established in 1960
1960 establishments in Argentina